The Race is a reality game show broadcast on Sky One in the UK from 6 to 12 November 2006, hosted by Denise van Outen.

Format
The show pitted two teams of celebrities (one all-male, one all-female) against one another; each led by a professional Formula One racing driver in a battle of the sexes.

Contestants
The Boys (team captain Eddie Irvine):
Nigel Benn
Les Ferdinand
Gary Numan
Brian Johnson
Nick Moran

The Girls (team captain David Coulthard):
Ms. Dynamite
Jenny Frost
Tamara Ecclestone
Melissa Joan Hart
Ingrid Tarrant

External links

2006 British television series debuts
2006 British television series endings
2000s British reality television series
English-language television shows
Sky UK original programming